Juice Rap News is an internet based satirical news show, created in Melbourne by The Juice Media. The show was the creation of a duo, Hugo Farrant and Giordano Nanni, based in Australia and consists of a rapped "news report" with social commentary using comical rap lyrics. The show is known for using satire and rap rhyming to analyse important topics of the day in a humorous, yet philosophical fashion. Juice Rap News is distributed via YouTube. Some episodes were licensed to the international television news channel RT for rebroadcast. The audience of Juice Rap News is international and episodes have been translated into more than 20 languages. 35 episodes were produced in total, plus a video announcing that the 35th episode was the final they would produce. However, in September 2016, due to audience demand, Giordano Nanni produced a special episode for that year's United States presidential election, and announced that the series would continue to produce content from time to time, with a new crew.

Nanni and Farrant co-wrote and produced the series together in their home studio in Melbourne, Australia. Nanni focused on content (crafting the arguments, narrative and perspectives depicted and explored in the show); while Farrant focused on form (giving the dialogue the "rhyme and flow" of rap and performing the vocals of most of the characters). Farrant portrayed the anchor Robert Foster and a host of other characters, including the regulars General Baxter and Terrence Moonseed. Nanni also appeared in the show, portraying many characters, such as Aussie correspondent Ken Oathcarn, "MSMBS" host Brian Washington, PR host Ivan Sakamunev, Bill de Berg and George Torwell, all using vox by Hugo Farrant. The goal was to provide an alternative view on world events, one that they felt was lacking in popular media outlets.

Recurring fictional characters

Robert Foster 
Robert Foster, performed by Hugo Farrant, is the anchor and central character of Rap News.

General Baxter 
Darth H. Baxter, also performed by Hugo Farrant, is a caricature representing the Military Industrial Complex. When war is in the news, General Baxter is called upon to give the point of view of war-mongering, colonialist governance. Baxter often changes his uniform to represent the topic.

Terrence Moonseed 
Terrence Moonseed, again performed by Hugo Farrant, is the caricature of the resident mad pseudo-scientist / hippy that often counterpoints General Baxter with new age spirituality and conspiracy theories.

Ken Oathcarn 
Ken Oathcarn, portrayed by Giordano Nanni (with vox by Hugo Farrant), is an Australian bogan stereotype and correspondent for Rap News who appears when Rap News handles Australian-centric topics. In July 2013, Ken Oathcarn visited Julian Assange in the Ecuadorian Embassy in London to give Assange a "makeover" for his campaign for senate in Australia.

Brian Washington (Brain Washing) 
Fictional news reporter for "MSMBS" (which is an acronym for Mainstream Media Bullshit and also similar to MSNBC), portraying mainstream American news reporters in a satirical manner.

William De Berg 
William De Berg (Bill De Berg – Bilderberg) is a shady businessman who takes advantage of the situation to capitalise.  He represents the international business elite colluding to control government policies and legal systems. He also represents the Illuminati and the New World Order. Bill de Berg filled in for Robert Foster and hosted Episode 36, about the 2016 US Presidential Election.

Cameo appearances

Julian Assange 
Julian Assange appeared in Rap News Number 5 only a few weeks before the "Cablegate" story broke in December 2010. Later, in Episode 20, Assange gets a "makeover" by Ken Oathcarn, donning a mullet wig, singing John Farnham's "You're the Voice" recorded in the Ecuadorian Embassy in London.

Noam Chomsky 
Linguist and political writer Noam Chomsky appeared in Rap News 10. Chomsky's segment was recorded whilst he was visiting Australia to collect the 2011 City of Sydney Peace Prize.

Kristinn Hrafnsson 
Investigative journalist and WikiLeaks spokesman Kristinn Hrafnsson appeared in Rap News 13 (A News Hope) to defend WikiLeaks in the context of Newscorp's phone hacking scandal.

Sage Francis 
Hip-hop artist Sage Francis appeared in Rap News 21.

Abby Martin 
RT America presenter and journalist Abby Martin appeared in Rap News 23, criticizing military intervention in Crimea.

Norman Finkelstein 
American and Jewish political scientist, activist, professor, and author Norman Finkelstein appeared and rapped in Rap News 24, "Israel vs Palestine", as part of a segment hosted by MSMBS anchorman Brian Washington. Finkelstein calls in to the MSMBS programme and interrupts the conversation between Israeli Prime Minister Benjamin Netanyahu and Brian Washington to criticise Israel's actions towards Palestine. He refers to Israel as a "lunatic state" and tells Bibi to "shut up" after the Israeli statesman accuses Finkelstein of being a "self-hating Jew".

DAM 
Palestinian rap group DAM appeared and rapped in Rap News 24, "Israel vs Palestine". The Palestinian trio filmed their scene in Ramallah next to the separation wall that divides Israel from the West Bank. In the episode, they conduct a conversation across the wall with Ken Oathcarn who is on an assignment to Israel to learn about its similarities with Australia as a settler colony. The DAM trio inform Ken Oathcarn about the day of the "Nakba" and voice their support for a one state solution to the conflict.

Scott Ludlam 
Senator of the Australian Greens party, Scott Ludlam appeared and rapped in Rap News 29, criticizing the actions of Prime Minister Tony Abbott in the lead-up to the 2014 G-20 Brisbane summit, labelling Mr Abbott's laws as "a fascist fuckfest of Orwellian proportions" and claiming to "go full Gandalf on this government's arse, smack down their laws with a dose of you shall not pass" before appearing dressed as Gandalf in the episode's credits.

Controversies

Rap News 20 caused controversy when it was released during the 2013 Australian Federal Election. Most of the controversy surrounded Julian Assange's appearance in the episode. The character Ken Oathcarn (played by Nanni) convinces Assange that if he is to be successful in his election bid for a Senate seat, he is in need of a make-over. Assange dons a flannel shirt, a blonde mullet wig and a fake Australian flag tattoo, and proceeds to sing a parody of John Farnham's "You’re The Voice." The video went viral soon after being posted online. It also featured on The Chaser's 2013 Federal Election coverage and Ten's The Project.

The offending scene was filmed in London's Ecuadorian Embassy where Assange has remained since seeking political asylum on 19 June 2012, which he was granted in August 2012. After Rap News went viral, Assange was publicly chastised for his appearance in the video by Ecuadorian President Rafael Correa, who said,

"We have sent him a letter: he can campaign politically, but without making fun of Australian politicians. We are not going to allow that. The rules of asylum in principle forbid meddling in the politics of the country that grants asylum. But as a matter of courtesy we are not going to bar Julian Assange from exercising his right to be a candidate. Just so long as he doesn't make fun of Australian politicians or people."

This was the first public indication of any friction between Assange and his Ecuadorian hosts.

Furthermore, many major media outlets failed to recognise Rap News 20 as satire, calling it a "campaign video," in what Farrant and Nanni described as "true to form."

In an interview with ABC Radio, the duo addressed the controversy and confusion, saying,

"In the world of the internet parody culture, what we’re doing is accepted and most people and most of the comments on the video and on Twitter and Facebook are overwhelmingly positive. It’s no surprise that once things are taken out of context and brought into the world, of, you know, the considerably more sober world of the mainstream media, these out of context quotes can be portrayed as offensive…We don’t really engage with that audience. Our audience is on the internet. We really pride ourselves on making an internet show and we’re trying to get people away from the more conventional, centralised, one-way media model, such as, basically, the traditional media. We love the fact that people can watch the video, post comments, we reply to comments, it’s a two way dialogue, it’s a totally different culture".

On 14 September 2013, Farrant and Nanni notified viewers that a copyright claim had been filed against the video for the parodic use of Farnham's "You're the Voice", despite protection for parody and satire under Part III: 41A and Part IV: 103AA of the Australian Copyright Act. On 26 October 2013, the duo uploaded a version without the parody, as an agreement with copyright holders had not been reached.

Reception
As of November 2017, the YouTube channel hosting Rap News has received more than 17 million total video views; additionally the channel has over 118,000 subscribers.

Rap News has been warmly received by organisations that advocate whistle-blowing including WikiLeaks and The Kindle Project.

The Rap News videos—either individually, or as a whole series—have been featured on a large number of esoteric and fringe-view websites. (Examples:)

Rap News 5 (The War on Journalism) 
Rap News 5 was 'video of the week' on an edition of Al-Jazeera's The Listening Post, which aired on 27 November 2010. A heavily edited version of RN5 (lasting just over 60 seconds) played out during the episode.

Rap News 15 (Big Brother is WWWatching You) 
In a very brief article, Michael Kelly of Business Insider wrote about Rap News, saying "This Australian website calls out the immense rise in US domestic surveillance" and went on to describe the Rap News 15 segment as "informative and entertaining".

Rap News 15 also came to the attention of American cryptographer and security expert Bruce Schneier, who posted a link to the video on his website, accompanied with text simply stating: "wow".

Rap News 19 (Whistleblower) 

Australian Senator Scott Ludlam quoted verbatim a small excerpt from Rap News 19 to conclude a speech he was making in the Australian Senate regarding whistle-blowers. The exact portion he quoted was "Whistleblowers; they leak in the public interest. Now what remains to be known is – is the public interested? If so, this might be a good day to exhibit it! Ignorance is a choice, in the age of the internet."

Rap News 20 (A Game of Polls) 

See controversies.

Rap News 22 (The Energy Crisis) 

Zachary Shahan of TreeHugger and CleanTechnica wrote two brief reviews of Rap News 22 in which he claimed to have "really enjoyed it and thought it was quite well done" but went on to say "while they are satirizing conspiracy theorists and global warming deniers, they probably reinforce the myths more than dispel them."

Rap News 23 (Crimea Media Wars) 

Rap News once again made The Listening Post's 'video of the week', with RN23. A two-minute extract from the Crimea Media Wars video was aired on 5 April edition of the program.

Episodes – Season 1 (2009–2011)

Episodes – Season 2 (2012–2013)

Episodes – Season 3 (2014)

Episodes – Season 4 (2015–)

See also 
 Les Guignols, in France
 26 minutes, in Switzerland

Notes

References

External links 
 Juice Media YouTube channel on the YouTube. Retrieved 20 November 2013
 Website Retrieved 20 November 2013
 Rap News

Musical groups from Melbourne
Australian political satire
Australian satirists
Viral videos
2000s YouTube series
2010s YouTube series